Sir Thomas Mason Wilford  (20 June 1870 – 22 June 1939) was a New Zealand politician. He held the seats of Wellington Suburbs then Hutt continuously for thirty years, from 1899 to 1929. Wilford was leader of the New Zealand Liberal Party, and Leader of the Opposition from 1920 to 1925.

Early life
Wilford was born in Lower Hutt in 1870. His parents were the surgeon John George Frederick Wilford and his wife, Elizabeth Catherine Mason. His grandfather on his mother's side was Thomas Mason. Wilford was a keen sportsman and athlete in his youth and competed in several sports including rugby, tennis and boxing. He obtained his education at Wellington College in the Wellington suburb of Mount Victoria, followed by Christ's College in Christchurch. He passed his examinations as a lawyer at age 18, but could not be admitted to the bar until he had reached the legal age of 21.

He married Georgia Constance McLean, daughter of George McLean, on 17 February 1892 at Dunedin. They had one son and one daughter.

Member of Parliament

Wilford was elected to the Wellington Suburbs electorate in the 1896 general election, but the result was declared void after an election petition on the grounds of corrupt and illegal practices as Wilford had exceeded the £200 election spending limit which had only recently been introduced. Charles Wilson was elected MP for that electorate following a by-election on 23 April 1897.

He was Chairman of Committees from 1909 to 1910.

Wilford was a member of the Wellington Harbour Board from 1900 to 1910, and chaired the Board from 1908 onwards. In 1901 Wilford ran for the Wellington mayoralty, losing to incumbent mayor John Aitken by 3,069 votes. He championed the redevelopment of the Hutt Road and railway linking Wellington city to the Hutt Valley from 1899 and 1911, skillfully working with and around local body groups to achieve a rather costly upgrade of the existing infrastructure. He resigned from the Harbour Board when he became Mayor of Wellington in 1910 for one year. After being re-elected unopposed he resigned as mayor of Wellington due to health issues.

Wilford almost died in 1911 after complications following an appendicitis operation. His health was to never fully recover. Wilford was forced to sail to England in early 1912 for more advanced surgery and during this long absence his position within the Liberal party was significantly weakened.

Minister

He was Minister of Justice, Minister of Marine and Minister of Stamps in the World War I National government from 14 November 1917 to 22 August 1919 under William Massey.

At a May 1919 caucus meeting to discuss the coalition between the Liberal and Reform parties a majority of members voted in favour of ending the arrangement upon leader Sir Joseph Ward's return from Europe. Wilford worked with his colleagues (particularly William MacDonald and George Warren Russell) to develop an updated policy manifesto for the next election. Following Ward's failure to gain re-election to parliament at the 1919 general election, Wilford nominated MacDonald to assume the leadership of the Liberal Party.

Leader of the Opposition
Wilford became the Leader of the Liberal Party and therefore Leader of the Opposition upon the death of William MacDonald in 1920. However, he was initially hampered in this position due to many Liberal MPs' wishes to remain leaderless until their defeated leader, Joseph Ward could re-enter Parliament.

There was talk of a proposed alliance of sorts between the Liberal and Labour parties in order to avoid vote splitting, similar to the Lib-Lab Pact in the UK. Wilford entered into discussions with Labour leader Harry Holland over a joint campaign and upon winning, forming a coalition to set up a proportional representation electoral system. The talks broke down however after Wilford demanded to hold office for a full term before holding an election under the new system.

The Liberals fared better under Wilford's leadership in 1922 than in the previous election, gaining an additional five seats. This can partly be attributed to Labour not standing candidates in all electorates against the Liberals in line with the ultimately failed joint campaign talks. However, the Liberals were still unable to regain office and by 1925, Wilford had yielded the leadership to George Forbes.

Labour politician, John A. Lee, a colleague who knew Wilford well, stated that while no one could have saved the Liberal party from its ultimate demise, if Wilford had been in better health, he would have delayed it, returning the Liberals to power and served as Prime Minister himself.

United Party
From 10 December 1928 to 10 December 1929 he was Minister of Justice for a second period, in the cabinet of Joseph Ward. Wilford was also Minister of Defence in the United ministry. This was a reflection that he "had a long-standing interest in naval policy, especially the Singapore Base, ... had travelled extensively in the Pacific and the Far East", and he "was regarded as something of a specialist in Far Eastern questions."

Post-parliamentary career
On 29 October 1929, Wilford was appointed King's Counsel. He resigned from Parliament on 18 November 1929 to become High Commissioner to the United Kingdom. In the 1930 King's Birthday Honours, Wilford was appointed a Knight Commander of the Order of St Michael and St George. In 1935, he was awarded the King George V Silver Jubilee Medal.

Death
Wilford died at Wellington on 22 June 1939, survived by his wife and two children. His wife, Georgia, Lady Wilford, died in Cheltenham, England, in 1952.

See also
List of King's and Queen's Counsel in New Zealand
Electoral history of Thomas Wilford

Notes

References

|-

|-

|-

|- 

|-

|-

 

1870 births
1939 deaths
Mayors of Wellington
Members of the Cabinet of New Zealand
New Zealand defence ministers
New Zealand Liberal Party MPs
Leaders of political parties in New Zealand
Leaders of the Opposition (New Zealand)
New Zealand MPs for Hutt Valley electorates
New Zealand MPs for Wellington electorates
Members of the New Zealand House of Representatives
High Commissioners of New Zealand to the United Kingdom
New Zealand King's Counsel
New Zealand Knights Commander of the Order of St Michael and St George
People from Lower Hutt
People educated at Wellington College (New Zealand)
People educated at Christ's College, Christchurch
Wellington Harbour Board members
19th-century New Zealand politicians
New Zealand politicians convicted of crimes
New Zealand politicians awarded knighthoods
Justice ministers of New Zealand